CH3 may refer to:
Channel 3 (band)
Channel 3 (Thai television network)
Methenium (methyl cation)
Methyl group (in chemistry)
Methyl radical (in chemistry)
Church Hymnal, third edition (Hymnbooks of the Church of Scotland)